John Tyler Zuber (born June 16, 1995) is an American professional baseball pitcher in the Arizona Diamondbacks organization. He made his MLB debut in 2020 with the Kansas City Royals.

Amateur career
Zuber attended White Hall High School in White Hall, Arkansas and played college baseball at the Arkansas State University. In 2016, he played collegiate summer baseball with the Brewster Whitecaps of the Cape Cod Baseball League. He was drafted by the Kansas City Royals in the sixth round of the 2017 Major League Baseball draft. He was the highest drafted  player in Arkansas State history.

Professional career

Kansas City Royals
Zuber spent his first professional season with the Burlington Royals and Lexington Legends. He pitched 2018 with Lexington and the Wilmington Blue Rocks and 2019 with Wilmington and the Northwest Arkansas Naturals. He was invited to Spring Training by the Royals in 2020.

Zuber made his major league debut on July 24, 2020 against the Cleveland Indians, pitching 2 scoreless innings. With the 2020 Kansas City Royals, Zuber appeared in 23 games, compiling a 1-2 record with 4.09 ERA and 30 strikeouts in 22.0 innings pitched.

Zuber was placed on the 60-day injured list to begin the 2022 season on March 16, 2022, due to right shoulder impingement syndrome.

Arizona Diamondbacks
On October 26, 2022, Zuber was claimed off waivers by the Arizona Diamondbacks. He was designated for assignment on November 9, 2022 and then sent outright to Triple-A on November 11.

References

External links

1995 births
Living people
People from Jefferson County, Arkansas
Baseball players from Arkansas
Major League Baseball pitchers
Kansas City Royals players
Arkansas State Red Wolves baseball players
Brewster Whitecaps players
Burlington Royals players
Lexington Legends players
Wilmington Blue Rocks players
Northwest Arkansas Naturals players
Omaha Storm Chasers players
Tigres del Licey players
American expatriate baseball players in the Dominican Republic